Margaret Muriel Commodore (or Margaret Joe) is a Canadian politician. She represented the electoral district of Whitehorse North Centre in the Yukon Legislative Assembly from 1982 to 1992, and Whitehorse Centre from 1992 to 1996. She was a member of the Yukon New Democratic Party.

Under the Tony Penikett governments, she was Minister of Health and Human Resources from 1986 to 1989 and the first Aboriginal Minister of Justice in Canada from 1989 to 1992. She was also the first-ever First Nations woman to ever be named to a cabinet in Canada in 1985.

Commodore is a member of the Sto:lo Nation. In 2013 she testified regarding her abuse at the hands of the residential school system at the Truth and Reconciliation Commission of Canada.

References

External links
 Margaret Commodore, profile excerpted from Joyce Hayden's book Yukon's Women of Power (archive copy)
 Recording of Commodore from The Legislature Speaks

Living people
20th-century First Nations people
First Nations women in politics
People from Chilliwack
Politicians from Whitehorse
Sto:lo people
Women MLAs in Yukon
Year of birth missing (living people)
Yukon New Democratic Party MLAs
20th-century Canadian women politicians